Lick Creek is a  long 1st order tributary to the Deep River in Moore County, North Carolina.

Course
Lick Creek rises in a pond about 1 mile southwest of Glendon in Moore County and then flows easterly to join the Deep River about 1 mile southeast of Glendon, North Carolina.

Watershed
Lick Creek drains  of area, receives about 48.0 in/year of precipitation, and has a wetness index of 400.17 and is about 55% forested.

See also
List of rivers of North Carolina

References

Rivers of North Carolina
Rivers of Moore County, North Carolina